The 2016–17 Nemzeti Bajnokság III is Hungary's third-level football competition.
Three teams were relegated including Szigetszentmiklós, Dunaújváros PASE, and Ajka from the 2015–16 Nemzeti Bajnokság II. 

On 28 March 2017, Tatabánya were disqualified from the Nemzeti Bajnokság III 2016–17 season.

Standings

West

Centre

East

Play-offs
The following teams qualified for the 2017-18 Nemzeti Bajnokság III season:

Participants

The following teams qualified for the 2017–18 Nemzeti Bajnokság III on slots.
THSE Sashalom (Budapest)
Füzesgyarmati SK (Békés)
Gyöngyösi AK (Heves),
Tiszafüred VSE (Jász-Nagykun-Szolnok) 
Vecsési FC (Pest) 
Pápai PFC (Veszprém) 
The following teams played play-offs to qualify.

2nd leg
The second leg of the play-offs were played on 17 June 2017.

See also
 2016–17 Nemzeti Bajnokság I
 2016–17 Nemzeti Bajnokság II
 2016–17 Magyar Kupa
 2017 Magyar Kupa Final

References

External links
  
  

Nemzeti Bajnokság III seasons
2016–17 in Hungarian football
Hun